The 1972 International Cross Country Championships was held in Cambridge, England, at the Coldhams Common on 18 March 1972.   A report on the men's event was given in the Glasgow Herald.  This was the last competition organized by the International Cross Country Union (ICCU).   The organization of the event was transferred to the IAAF as recommended as a result of the meeting of the IAAF cross-country committee that year in London. It was continued as IAAF World Cross Country Championships.  From then on, the event was open for all IAAF members whereas before, non-ICCU members were only allowed to compete after special invitation.

Complete results for men, junior men,  women, medallists, 
 and the results of British athletes were published.

Medallists

Individual Race Results

Men's (7.5 mi / 12.1 km)

Junior Men's (4.35 mi / 7.0 km)

Women's (2.8 mi / 4.5 km)

Team Results

Men's

Junior Men's

Women's

Participation
An unofficial count yields the participation of 200 athletes from 15 countries.

 (4)
 (19)
 (20)
 (6)
 (9)
 (20)
 (20)
 (12)
 (15)
 (20)
 (15)
 (10)
 (4)
 (6)
 (20)

See also
 1972 in athletics (track and field)

References

International Cross Country Championships
International Cross Country Championships
Cross
International Cross Country Championships
International Cross Country Championships
Cross country running in the United Kingdom
Sport in Cambridge
20th century in Cambridge